Flory and Florie are surnames.

Those bearing them include:

 David Flory, an English NHS manager
 Jean Flory (1886–1949), French religious leader
 Tom Florie (1897–1966), American soccer player
 Ishmael Flory (1907–2004), American activist 
 Paul Flory (1910–1985), American chemist
 Margaret Flory (born 1948), American politician
 Med Flory (1926–2014), American musician and actor
 Fran Flory (born c. 1962), American volleyball player and coach
 Jean-Claude Flory (born 1966), French politician
 Isabelle Flory, French violinist
 Bryce Florie (born 1970), American baseball player and coach
 Scott Flory (born 1976), Canadian football player
 Travis T. Flory (born 1992), American actor